Faucaria tigrina, tiger jaws (a name it shares with Faucaria felina), is a species of succulent plant in the family Aizoaceae. It is endemic to South Africa, but also widely spread in cultivation. It has fleshy triangular leaves, a clumping habit, and blooms in autumn with yellow daisy-like flowers.

It has gained the Royal Horticultural Society's Award of Garden Merit. In temperate zones it must be grown under glass to protect it from freezing temperatures. It requires a standard cactus potting compost and a position in full sun, with low humidity.

References

Flora of South Africa
Aizoaceae